San Gabriel, Texas is an unincorporated community located in northwest Milam County, Texas approximately 10 miles north of Thorndale on Ranch Road 486, or about 50 miles northeast of the Austin metropolitan area. San Gabriel has an elevation of 417 feet above sea level. San Gabriel appears on the San Gabriel U.S. Geological Survey Map and is in the Central Time Zone (UTC/GMT -6 hours - UTC/GMT -5 hours during Daylight Saving Time).

History
San Gabriel is named after the San Gabriel River in Central Texas. San Gabriel is located about 30 miles downstream from the site of the Battle of the San Gabriels in 1839, a battle fought during the Texas-Indian Wars that followed the Texas Republic's successful Revolution after the suspension of the 1824 Constitution of the United States of Mexico in favor of a centralist oriented constitution that led to the dictatorship of President Antonio López de Santa Anna.

Several Spanish missions were established near the site in an effort to bring Christianity to the Indian tribes living in the area, but these projects were abandoned by the mid-1750s. The mission buildings soon fell into ruin, and by the end of the 19th century little trace of them remained. The town of San Gabriel was formally established in 1843 or 1844, when Jesse and Peter Mercer built cabins on the San Gabriel River. Peter Mercer was murdered by local Indians on June 17, 1844, and was buried in Locklin Cemetery at San Gabriel, not far from where he was killed. The area on the San Gabriel River where he was killed is still called Mercer's Bluff. The community was granted a post office in 1850. By the mid-1880s San Gabriel had a steam gristmill-cotton gin, a church, two schools, and 130 residents. Cotton, corn, and oats were the principal crops grown by area farmers. Population estimates for San Gabriel ranged from a low of twenty-five in 1890 to a high of 350 in 1929. The number of residents fell to 200 by the early 1940s, and to seventy-five by the late 1950s. San Gabriel served as the center of a common-school district until 1960, when the school was consolidated with the nearby and academically well respected Thorndale Independent School District. The San Gabriel post office was discontinued in the late 1960s. Two churches, a business, and a community hall were marked at the site by county maps in the 1980s. The population in 1990 was 100. The population remained the same in the 2000 Census.

On April 6, 2019, an EF0 tornado struck the community, severely damaging a business.

References

Milam County, Texas
Towns in Texas